This is a breakdown of the results of the 2021 German federal election. The following tables display detailed results in each of the sixteen states and all 299 single-member constituencies.

Electoral system
Germany uses the mixed-member proportional representation system, a system of proportional representation combined with elements of first-past-the-post voting. The Bundestag has 598 nominal members, elected for a four-year term; these seats are distributed between the sixteen German states in proportion to the states' number of eligible voters.

Every elector has two votes: a constituency vote (first vote) and a party list vote (second vote). Based solely on the first votes, 299 members are elected in single-member constituencies by first-past-the-post voting. The second votes are used to produce a proportional number of seats for parties, first in the states, and then in the Bundestag. Seats are allocated using the Sainte-Laguë method. If a party wins fewer constituency seats in a state than its second votes would entitle it to, it receives additional seats from the relevant state list. Parties can file lists in every single state under certain conditions, such as a fixed number of supporting signatures. Parties can receive second votes only in those states in which they have filed a state list. If a party, by winning single-member constituencies in one state, receives more seats than it would be entitled to according to its second vote share in that state (so-called overhang seats), the other parties receive compensation seats. Owing to this provision, the Bundestag usually has more than 598 members; 735 seats were awarded in this election, up from 709 seats in 2017. The 19th Bundestag elected in 2017 had 709 seats: 598 regular seats and 111 overhang and compensation seats. Overhang seats are calculated at the state level, so many more seats are added to balance this out among the states, adding more seats than would be needed to compensate for overhang at the national level in order to avoid negative vote weight.

In order to qualify for seats based on the party-list vote share, a party must either win three single-member constituencies via first votes or exceed a threshold of 5% of the second votes nationwide. If a party only wins one or two single-member constituencies and fails to get at least 5% of the second votes, it keeps the single-member seat(s), but other parties that accomplish at least one of the two threshold conditions receive compensation seats. The most recent example of this was in 2002, when the PDS won only 4.0% of the second votes nationwide but won two constituencies in the state of Berlin. The same applies if an independent candidate wins a single-member constituency, which has not happened since 1949. If a voter cast a first vote for a successful independent candidate or a successful candidate whose party failed to qualify for proportional representation, his or her second vote does not count toward proportional representation; however, it counts toward whether the elected party exceeds the 5% threshold. Parties representing recognized national minorities (currently Danes, Frisians, Sorbs, and Romani people) are exempt from the 5% threshold.

Nationwide

Leaders' races

By state

Summary

Schleswig-Holstein

Mecklenburg-Vorpommern

Hamburg

Lower Saxony

Bremen

Brandenburg

Saxony-Anhalt

Berlin

North Rhine-Westphalia

Saxony

Hesse

Thuringia

Rhineland-Palatinate

Bavaria

Baden-Württemberg

Saarland

Notes

References

2021 elections in Germany
2021